= Savage Horrors =

2020 nonfiction book by Corinna Lenhardt

Savage Horrors: The Intrinsic Raciality of the American Gothic
- Cover
- Author: Corinna Lenhardt
- Language: English
- Series: American Culture Studies
- Subject: American Gothic literature, contemporary gothic studies, race, literary studies
- Genre: Nonfiction, academic monograph
- Publisher: transcript publishing
- Publication date: March 2020
- Media type: Print (paperback), Digital
- Pages: 288
- ISBN: 9783837651546

Savage Horrors: The Intrinsic Raciality of the American Gothic is a 2020 academic monograph by German literary scholar, author, and academic Corinna Lenhardt. The book was published by transcript publishing, and is part of its American Culture Studies series. Lenhardt covers the role of race in American Gothic literature, from its roots in British Romanticism to more recent works. The author identifies a recurring "Savage Villain/Civil Hero" motif in White Anglo-Saxon Protestant writing and shows how African American authors addressed and adapted this motif in their own texts.

== Summary ==
The book investigates how racial constructs have shaped American Gothic literature from its British roots through contemporary U.S. fiction. In this work, Lenhardt identifies what she describes as an intrinsic raciality embedded in the genre's core binary structures, focusing on the enduring presence of the "Savage Villain/Civil Hero Gotheme." She traces how this framework emerged in early British Gothic, evolved in White Anglo-Saxon Protestant (WASP) American contexts, and was subsequently engaged, adapted, and challenged by African American writers in ways that highlight both systemic oppression and literary resistance.

The book begins with an introduction that outlines the scope of the study and situates the Gothic as a transnational phenomenon with distinctive "British origins." It then divides its discussion into three parts. Part I defines the Gothic and explores the early British development of the Savage Villain/Civil Hero motif. Part II examines how this motif appeared in early WASP American Gothic and continued in more recent American texts, illustrating iterative patterns over time. Part III demonstrates how African American authors engaged with and reworked this motif, discussing the concept's appearance in Black writing from the late eighteenth century onward. An epilogue concludes the volume by reflecting on the relationship between raciality and American Gothic, proposing possibilities for rethinking entrenched discursive binaries.

== Reviews ==
In his review, German American studies scholar Dustin Breitenwischer pointed out that Lenhardt made a sweeping claim: the Gothic is inescapably racialized. He commended her coverage of both historical and modern American texts. He noted her focus on White authors who perpetuated racial tropes and Black authors who subverted them. He highlighted her extensive theoretical framework but observed that it sometimes slowed the reading process. He wrote that Lenhardt's study "confronts and challenges the established genre, traditional aesthetic, and cultural communication of the U. S. American Gothic with an overdue critique of its foundational vices." He mentioned that the book's dissertation-like structure created a detailed but occasionally laborious read. He indicated that Lenhardt's argument would be highly valuable for those studying American literature and critical race theory.

Albina Vladimirovna Skisova found Lenhardt's book notable for its broad coverage and detailed analyses. Skisova saw Lenhardt's main argument as the claim that all Gothic literature, especially American, is inherently racialized. She appreciated the author's examination of both White and African American Gothic texts from the eighteenth century to the present. However, Skisova questioned the universality of Lenhardt's claim that all Gothic literature is necessarily shaped by race. She suggested that focusing primarily on Black and White reduces the complexity of American Gothic. She concluded that while the monograph is valuable and wide-ranging, its argument may be too general in asserting that "American Gothic" should be subdivided strictly on racial lines.

Irina Golovacheva's review discussed Lenhardt's emphasis on race as central to American Gothic. She showed how Lenhardt views the "Savage Villain / Civilized Hero" motif as universal in American texts. She noted Lenhardt's argument that American Gothic did not merely import British motifs. Rather, it acquired new racial meanings in the New World. She also highlighted the idea that African American writers were using Gothic elements as early as Olaudah Equiano. She pointed out that Lenhardt views Gothic as a fluid strategy rather than a strict genre. She concluded that Lenhardt finds race inseparable from American Gothic and sees few signs this will change soon.

== Awards ==
- Dissertation Prize of the Association for Research in the Fantastic in 2021
